Presidential elections were held in Croatia on 22 December 2019. Social Democratic Party  nominee Zoran Milanović narrowly defeated incumbent president Kolinda Grabar-Kitarović in a second round of voting.

As no candidate received a majority of all votes (including blank, invalid and uncast ballots), a second round took place on 5 January 2020 between the two candidates with the highest number of votes in the first round. They were the seventh presidential elections since the first direct ones were held in 1992.

The decision to call the elections was made by the Croatian Government during its session on 14 November 2019. Potential candidates were required to gather at least 10,000 signatures from Croatian citizens who have reached the age of 18 in order for their candidacy to become official and for their name to appear on the ballot. They were allocated a time frame of 12 days to accomplish this and thus had until midnight local time on 3 December 2019 to present their signatures to the State Electoral Commission. A total of twelve candidates submitted signatures by the deadline and the commission then proceeded to verify the signatures within the following 48 hours, presenting a final list of eleven approved candidates on 5 December 2019.

In the first round of the election, which was held on 22 December 2019, former prime minister Zoran Milanović finished in first place with a relative majority of 29.55% of all votes cast. He was followed closely by incumbent president Kolinda Grabar-Kitarović, who received 26.65% of the vote, and by Miroslav Škoro, who acquired 24.45% of the vote. As no candidate managed to reach the required percentage of the vote to win outright in the first round, a run-off election took place on 5 January 2020 between the two candidates with the most votes in the first round: Milanović and Grabar-Kitarović. Zoran Milanović won the second round with 52.66% of the vote and was thus elected the 5th President of Croatia since its independence in 1991, while Grabar-Kitarović became the second (consecutive) Croatian president not to have been reelected for a second term, after Ivo Josipović (2010-2015). Furthermore, the number of votes received by Zoran Milanović, in regard to both the first (562,783) and the second (1,034,170) round of the election, is the lowest of any victorious presidential candidate to date. On the other hand, the number of votes (507,628) and the percentage of the vote (26.65%) acquired by Grabar-Kitarović in the first round is the lowest for any Croatian president.

Background

The incumbent president of Croatia, Kolinda Grabar-Kitarović, took office on 19 February 2015 and her term is due to end on 18 February 2020. The presidential term of Zoran Milanović is due to begin on 19 February 2020 and end on 18 February 2025.

Electoral system
The president of Croatia is directly elected by secret ballot to a term of 5 years using a two-round system. The Constitution of Croatia requires that a presidential election be held no sooner than 60 days and no later than 30 days before the expiration of the incumbent president's term. An absolute majority (50% + 1 vote) of all votes cast (including invalid, blank and uncast ballots) is required to win in the first round. If no candidate acquires such a majority, a second-round is to be held in 14 days' time, with the two candidates with the highest number of votes in the first round taking part. The candidate who acquires the highest number of votes in the second round (a majority of valid cast votes) is declared the winner. If one of the candidates who has won a high enough number of votes to take part in the second round were to abandon his candidacy or die, the candidate with the next highest number of votes in the first round will earn the right to take part in the second round. Furthermore, Croatian presidents may serve a maximum of two 5-year terms in their lifetime (a total of 10 years if both terms are won and served out in full).

In order for a potential candidate to be legally allowed to contest the election and have their name placed on the ballot, they must gather at least 10,000 signatures from eligible voters, with every such signatory being permitted to give his signature of support to only one potential candidate. The time frame for collecting the said number of signatures is set at 12 days, and after the expiry of this period potential candidates must submit them to the State Electoral Commission for verification.

Candidates
On 5 December, the State Electoral Commission published a list of 11 candidates.

Withdrawn bids
 Vlaho Orepić withdrew on 2 December. He had initially scheduled the submission of his signatures of endorsement to the State Electoral Commission for 3 December 2019, however after having managed to collect only 8,054 signatures by the evening of 2 December, he determined that he would be unlikely to reach the required quota of 10,000 signatures by the set deadline and he thus withdrew his candidacy. He is a member of the Croatian Parliament (2017–) and the former Minister of the Interior (2016–2017). He had announced his bid on 11 July.
 Tomislav Panenić withdrew on 3 December. He is a current member of the Croatian Parliament (2016–) and the former Minister of Economy (2016). His bid was announced on 26 June.
 Ante Simonić withdrew on 3 December. He is a former Deputy Prime Minister of Croatia, having served in the Second Račan cabinet. He has announced his bid on 14 July 2019.

Failed candidacies 
These individuals failed to submit the required number of endorsement signatures.
Slobodan Midžić, a perennial potential candidate who submitted just one signature of endorsement to the State Electoral Commission on 3 December 2019. He had previously unsuccessfully attempted to become an official candidate in the 2009 and the 2014 elections.
 Josip Juretić, an activist. His bid was announced on 7 September.
 Ivan Rude, a lawyer from Šibenik. His bid was announced on 16 September.
 Ava Karabatić, a TV personality, singer, and model from Zadar. Her bid was announced on 30 September. Subsequently, she endorsed Zoran Milanović.
 David Lucijan Rožman, a student. His bid was announced on 1 October.
 Antun Babić, a former deputy chief of mission-minister plenipotentiary in the Croatian embassy in Ireland. His bid was announced on 14 February 2019
 Goran Jurišić, a member of HSP 1861. His bid was announced on 3 January 2019.
 Marko Vučetić, a member of the Croatian Parliament (2016 onwards). His bid was announced on 14 November 2018.

Declined to be candidates
These individuals have been the subject of presidential speculation, but have publicly denied or recanted interest in running for president.
 Ivo Josipović, Member of the Croatian Parliament (2003–2010), President of Croatia (2010–2015), and a SDP member. Zoran Milanović ultimately became the SDP's candidate.
 Predrag Matić, MEP (2019 onwards), Minister of Veterans' Affairs (2011–2015), member of the Croatian Parliament (2015–2019), and an SDP member. Zoran Milanović ultimately became the SDP's candidate.
Tonino Picula, MEP (2013 onwards), Minister of Foreign Affairs (2000–2003), and an SDP member. Zoran Milanović ultimately became the SDP's candidate.
 Krešo Beljak, President of the HSS and a member of the Croatian Parliament (2016 onwards). HSS ultimately endorsed the SDP's candidate, Zoran Milanović.
 Anka Mrak-Taritaš, President of the Glas and a member of the Croatian Parliament (2016 onwards), Minister of Construction and Spatial Planning (2012–2015). Glas ultimately endorsed the SDP's candidate, Zoran Milanović.
Božo Petrov, President of the Most, Member of the Croatian Parliament (2015 onwards), Deputy Prime Minister of Croatia (2016), Speaker of the Croatian Parliament (2016–2017). Most ultimately endorsed independent candidate Miroslav Škoro.
Ruža Tomašić, MEP (2013 onwards), Member of the Croatian Parliament (2003–2007, 2011–2013), and a HKS member. HKS ultimately endorsed independent candidate Miroslav Škoro.
Milan Bandić, Mayor of Zagreb (2000–2002, 2005 onwards) and the president of BM 365 (2015 onwards). Bandić ultimately endorsed independent candidate Kolinda Grabar-Kitarović.
Dejan Jović, Chief Political Analyst and Special Coordinator in the Office of the President of Croatia (2010–2014). Considered a possible candidate for the Independent Democratic Serb Party (SDSS).

Campaign

First round

Endorsements

Debates 
After official validation of candidates by the State Electoral Commission, the first debate was a confrontation between Katarina Peović (RF and SRP) and Anto Đapić (Democratic Alliance for National Renewal), the most left-wing and the most-right wing candidate respectively, which was filmed by and broadcast on N1 television on 5 December 2019.

On 17 December, the Croatian Radiotelevision held the general debate with all 11 candidates participated. It was the only debate where all first-round candidates participated.

Second round

Endorsements

Debates 
On 30 December, RTL held the first general debate with two second round candidates participated.  Croatian Radiotelevision held the second debate on 2 January 2020. The third and final general debate was held on Nova TV on 3 January.

Opinion polls

First round
Polls conducted after the official start of the campaign

Second round
Polls conducted after the first round

Polls conducted after the official start of the campaign

Opinion polls

Results
The first round of the election took place on 22 December 2019, with former Social Democratic Prime Minister Zoran Milanović winning by a plurality of 29.55% of the vote, ahead of conservative incumbent President Kolinda Grabar-Kitarović, who received 26.65% of the vote. The conservative folk musician and former Member of Parliament Miroslav Škoro, who was running as an independent candidate, narrowly failed to reach the run-off election, managing to attract the support of 24.45% of voters. This marked the first time in Croatian history that the incumbent president did not receive the highest number of votes in the first round. Also, Grabar-Kitarović attained both the lowest number of votes (507,626) and the lowest percentage of votes of any Croatian president competing in either of the two rounds of elections. Milanović received both the lowest number of votes (562,779) and the lowest percentage of the vote of any first-place candidate in the first round of a presidential election. Škoro received the highest number of votes (465,703) for a third-placed candidate since Mate Granić (HDZ) in the 2000 elections and the highest-ever percentage of the vote for a candidate who did not advance to the run-off. Milanović received a plurality of the vote in Croatia's three largest cities; 33.02% in Zagreb, 30.79% in Split and 41.87% in Rijeka, and finished second (25.61%) in the fourth largest city, Osijek, which was won by Škoro (33.33%). Grabar-Kitarović came in second in Split and Rijeka, and third in Zagreb and Osijek.

A run-off was held between Milanović and Grabar-Kitarović on 5 January 2020. Milanović won by just over 104,000 votes, becoming the fifth President of Croatia since independence and the second to have been officially nominated by the Social Democratic Party, after Ivo Josipović (2010–2015). Furthermore, Milanović received a majority of the vote in seven counties and in the City of Zagreb, while Grabar-Kitarović defeated him among voters living in thirteen counties and among the members of the Croatian diaspora. However, Milanović defeated Grabar-Kitarović in all four major cities: Zagreb (by around 74,000 votes), Split (by around 3,000 votes), Rijeka (by around 20,000 votes) and Osijek (by around 1,000 votes).

By county

First round

Second round

Maps

First round

Second round

Voter demographics 
Ipsos Puls exit polls for the first round of the election suggested the following demographic breakdown:

See also

 2020s in political history
 List of presidents of Croatia

Notes

References

External links
Official website

Presidential elections in Croatia
Presidential election
Presidential election
December 2019 events in Croatia
January 2020 events in Croatia
Modern history of Croatia
Croatia
Croatia